The European Agency for Safety and Health at Work (EU-OSHA) is a decentralised agency of the European Union with the task of collecting, analysing and disseminating relevant information that can serve the needs of people involved in safety and health at work. Set up in 1994 by Council Regulation (EC) No 2062/94 of 18 July 1994, EU-OSHA is based in Bilbao, Spain, where it has a staff of occupational safety and health, communication and administrative specialists. William Cockburn is the current Interim Executive Director of EU-OSHA.

EU-OSHA collects, analyses and disseminates information related to occupational safety and health across the EU and contributes to an evidence base which policymakers can use to establish future policies regarding occupational safety and health. EU-OSHA publishes a monthly newsletter, OSHmail, which deals with occupational health and safety topics, and provides in-depth publications, such as detailed reports, regarding occupational safety and health information.

EU-OSHA works through diverse networks spanning the EU, with its main activities covering three distinct areas: analysis and research, prevention, and campaigning and awareness raising. EU-OSHA was given an important role in the European strategy on Health and Safety at Work (2007–12) and this was reflected in the EU-OSHA Strategy and Annual Management Plan.

Networks 
EU-OSHA works in partnership with a wide range of organisations. The Directorate-General Employment, Social Affairs & Inclusion is its reference at the European Commission. At a national level, EU-OSHA is represented by a network of "focal points" in over 30 countries across Europe. Focal points are usually the primary safety and health organisation of a particular country. Each focal point operates a tripartite national network to ensure that information on safety and health at work can be effectively collected and disseminated.

EU-OSHA emphasises the importance of a tripartite approach, whereby EU-OSHA works in partnership with governments, employers and workers' representatives. This tripartite structure (Governing Board) is key to the way EU-OSHA carries out its campaigns. Through its campaigns EU-OSHA also works with companies and associations in the public and private sector, and with the Enterprise Europe Network (EEN), a business support network that aims to help small businesses in the European marketplace.

Main activities

Analysis and research 
EU-OSHA is responsible for contributing to the evidence base through commissioning, collecting and publishing studies on occupational safety and health as well as monitoring, collating and analysing statistical information on occupational safety and health risks in workplaces across the EU.

In 2005, EU-OSHA established the European Risk Observatory (ERO) to try to identify and predict such risks. To achieve this aim, the ERO "provides an overview of safety and health at work in Europe, describes the trends and underlying factors, and anticipates changes in work and their likely impact on occupational safety and health". ERO identifies research areas for prioritisation and indicates the appropriate action that policy and decision makers should take.

In 2009, EU-OSHA carried out an EU-wide survey, the European enterprise survey on new and emerging risks (ESENER). The survey involved approximately 36,000 interviews with managers and health and safety representatives and aimed to get an insight into how European companies were managing health and safety issues. The survey was particularly concerned with "new" psychosocial risks, "such as work-related stress, violence and bullying", and highlighted that these risks are a growing concern. ESENER has provided policy makers with information relevant to the creation of future policies in the area of health and safety and has revealed issues of particular concern that require prioritisation. EU-OSHA has produced a number of follow-up studies analysing the results of the ESENER and plans to carry out a second survey in 2014.

EU-OSHA is also running an innovative project known as Foresight, which aims to look beyond current safety and health risks to anticipate the potential areas of future concern. Foresight involves looking at the possible scenarios that may arise with technological or wider societal change, and the effect these changes may have on occupational safety and health. The project aims to stimulate debate, and to make it clear to policy- and decision makers what the implications of particular courses of action are. The project also suggests how possible future risks may be avoided. The first Foresight project is concerned with producing "sets of scenarios for 2020, covering a range of new technologies in green jobs and the impact they could have on workers' safety and health".

Prevention 
EU-OSHA aims to create a culture of risk prevention and is involved with designing practical instruments that can be used by companies of micro, small and medium sizes that will help them to assess workplace risks and to share knowledge and good practices on safety and health. As part of this aim EU-OSHA has created an online interactive risk assessment project (OiRA), launched in September 2011. The OiRA provides "an easy-to-use and cost-free web application" that allows users to create online risk assessment tools. It is an interactive tool that can be used by any micro or small enterprise to carry out a risk assessment.

Campaigning and awareness-raising 
EU-OSHA is active in raising awareness about occupational safety and health and these issues are promoted primarily through Healthy Workplaces Campaigns, which have been run with partners in the EU's Member States since 2000. Each campaign runs for two years and has a different focus. The current campaign, Working together for risk prevention, is concerned with encouraging "managers, workers and other stakeholders to join forces to improve safety and health". As part of each campaign EU-OSHA produces "information, practical guides and tools, and publicity material freely available, translated into more than 20 European languages" The campaigns run in partnership between EU-OSHA and more than 80 campaign partners, as well as through the agencies' network of national focal points and the Enterprise Europe Network.

Linked to and acting as an annual focus for campaigns, EU-OSHA is coordinating the European Week for Safety and Health at Work, held each year in October, when events such as training sessions, conferences and workshops are held. Such events are organised across Europe by the focal points in Member States.

EU-OSHA, along with six national safety and health organisations, participates in a consortium that has produced a number of animated films which aim to convey the importance of health and safety in the workplace. The main character in these films – known as Napo – is essentially a typical employee who can be the victim of situations over which he has no control but he can also identify hazards or risks, and make good suggestions to improve safety and work organisation. The films are all language-free, making them widely accessible, and have won a number of awards. Napo has become somewhat of a mascot for EU-OSHA's campaigning activities, and is now being used to introduce health and safety issues to children in primary schools (Napo for teachers).

See also 
Agencies of the European Union
European Foundation for the Improvement of Living and Working Conditions
National Institute for Safety and Health at Work (Spain, EU-OSHA member)
 OSHwiki

References

External links 
European Agency for Safety and Health at Work website
 EU-OSHA news feed in Twitter
 EU-OSHA information feed on Facebook
 EU-OSHA business related information in Linkedin
 EU-OSHA videos
 OSHmail news feed
Directorate-General Employment, Social Affairs & Inclusion

1994 establishments in the European Union
Agencies of the European Union
Organisations based in Bilbao
Government agencies established in 1994
Medical and health organisations based in Spain
Health and the European Union